The Chamber is an American game show that aired on Fox in January 2002. The show featured contestants answering questions while strapped into a torture chamber, in which they were exposed to either very hot or very cold temperatures alongside other environmental extremes, such as high winds or simulated earthquakes. After only three of its six taped episodes were aired, the series was cancelled due to low ratings and controversy over the show's content.

Gameplay

Pre-game faceoff
To begin, two contestants (always one male and one female) were given a category by host Rick Schwartz. The contestants went back and forth, providing a single answer that fit the category, until one person either gave an incorrect answer, duplicated an answer, or took too much time. At that moment, the opponent could score a point by giving one more right answer. The first to score two points in this way moved on to the main game.

Main game
Before entering the Chamber, the contestant was offered a $500 buyout to leave the game, which nobody took. To begin, the contestant was strapped into a chair, arms raised over the head. During the pre-game setup, a computer would choose whether the contestant would play against the "hot" or "cold" chamber.

Rules
Each player's goal was to answer as many questions, and to last in the chamber as long as possible. The player would be said to have won if they remained in the chamber, correctly answering questions through all seven rounds. Otherwise, the game could end in any of the following ways:
 Answering two consecutive questions incorrectly.
 The player's "stress quotient" exceeding a predetermined "Danger Zone" threshold for 20 seconds. Viewers only knew that it was an equation that used blood pressure, heart rate and body temperature as variables. However, unlike ABC's The Chair, players were not penalized monetarily for exceeding their Danger Zone.
 The show's medical staff could stop the game if they felt that the player would not be able to continue, or had been rendered unconscious from the stress. Neither of these happened, though one contestant, Jennifer Basa, nearly reached that point, and had to receive clearance from the show's medical staff in order to continue.
 The player could voluntarily end the game by saying, "Stop the chamber!"

As each round began, one minute was put on the clock and questions were asked to the player, each worth $1,000 if answered correctly. If the game ended for any of the aforementioned reasons above, the money was cut in half. If the player beat the level, the game would go into stop down mode for ten seconds, allowing Schwartz to check the contestant's status, after which the conditions inside would intensify. The maximum amount of questions was not stated, but with six questions per level and seven levels, the potential top prize would be $126,000.

Conditions
If the winner could also manage to answer 25 questions or more correctly, the total winnings would be tripled. Additionally, that environment would be retired, and something new created. It was reported that plans for future chambers centered around themes such as water, electric (shock) or insects; Bill Carter of The New York Times wrote that the latter may have involved "500 flies" released into the chamber. Only two variants of the chamber were depicted on the episodes which aired: a "hot" chamber and a "cold" chamber.

Show format
For the first two aired episodes, there were three games played per hour. For the final episode, a fourth game was added to fill out the time. A male voice (Tony Rodgers) asked the questions, and a female voice (Karly Rothenberg) would let contestants and viewers know when the Chamber was transitioning into higher levels and shutting down. However, on the last-aired episode, Schwartz asked the questions as well as conducting interviews during the down time.

Production
The series was developed by Mike Darnell, then head of alternative programming at Fox, in conjunction with Dick Clark Productions. Darnell claimed he was inspired by Fear Factor, which had debuted on NBC in 2001, and wanted The Chamber to emphasize the "visceral" effects the game had on the contestants, telling Bill Carter of The New York Times, "I want to hear if they are in pain or suffering". Preston Beckman, a fellow Fox executive, believed Darnell conceived and produced the show with the intent of leading viewers to wonder if "Fox might actually kill someone on television".

The producers of the ABC game show The Chair, which also premiered in early 2002 and had previously been pitched to Darnell at Fox, sued over alleged similarities between the two programs, including contestants answering trivia questions in a high-stress environment with their vital signs monitored throughout. Fox countersued, claiming that the ABC program had sent producers to "spy on the set" of The Chamber. In a 2007 book, Carter reports that Darnell did in fact conceive the show as a response to The Chair, and that The Chamber was rushed into production in November 2001 after ABC beat out Fox for the rights to the other show.

The Chamber began taping at Hollywood Center Studios in late December 2001. Sportscaster Matt Vasgersian was initially chosen to host, but objected to the show's content and quit, walking off set "in disgust" during a rehearsal. He was replaced by Rick Schwartz, a sports radio host in Los Angeles. During production, an incident occurred when the chamber malfunctioned and briefly left a contestant trapped inside the hot chamber, with crew members unable to either release them from the set or turn off the heating effects for "some moments," though they were freed without injury. Gail Berman, then the president of Fox, was on set at the time and greatly disturbed by the event.

Being produced in parallel with The Chair, ABC and Fox competed to get their respective shows on the air first, with The Chamber ultimately premiering on Sunday, January 13, 2002, two days before The Chair.

Reception 
The Chamber received negative reviews, with Carter reporting that the show caused "a critical outcry over subjecting people to what appeared to be torture for the entertainment of television viewers". The Baltimore Suns Kevin Cowherd called the show "a sordid, putrid mess". In Variety, Phil Gallo described it as "a prototype for the joy-free gameshow".

The series premiered to around ten million viewers in the United States, performing best among younger audiences, but viewership had declined to 5.6 million by the third episode, when it had been moved to Friday nights. It was cancelled as Fox executives concluded that its declining viewership made it hard to justify continuing a show "that was generating so much hostile reaction".

One contestant, Scott Brown, passed through all seven levels of the cold chamber and answered twenty questions correctly; he won $20,000, more than any other contestant on the show. After his game however, he was hospitalized for hypothermia, and sued Fox and the producers of the show. The lawsuit was settled out of court, and Brown was awarded an additional $100,000 for compensation.

References

External links
 
 Official site (via Internet Archive)

2000s American game shows
2002 controversies in the United States
2002 American television series debuts
2002 American television series endings
Fox Broadcasting Company original programming
Television controversies in the United States
Television series by Dick Clark Productions
Works about torture